Ubauro is a town in Ghotki District in Northern Sindh province, Pakistan.

Ubauro is a great last town of Sindh Province on National Highway towards Punjab. Population of Sindhis, Saraykis, Punjabis and Muhajirs and all languages of these people spoken and understood. In the main town there is the famous and oldest Tomb dergah of Palan imam shah Bukhari. The source of income for the majority of population is agriculture and trading of its products. Ubauro was given the status of Tehsil (Taluqa) during the British Raj, and many buildings were constructed here for administration and revenue collection. 

Ubauro has all four weathers including monsoon in July and August.

Before partition it was a small walled city with a majority Hindu population. The Hindus of Ubauro were well off and owned many lands and business not only in nearby areas but far-flung areas of the country, and they had political awareness during that era as well. There were many accessible gates to enter in the town and this town was constructed on some elevated place in order to protect it from floods of river Indus. This town is surrounded by lush green fertile lands, which grow many crops including the vegetable and fruits.

Before partition, this town was populated by Hindus, Chachars, Samas, Dahars, Dayas, Thaeems, Soomros, Supio etc. 

After partition the demography of Ubauro was completely changed and with the migration of Hindus many other Sindhi and Balouch tribes settled in Ubaurao and Muhajirs and Punjabis migrated and settled in this town.

Ubauro is now the largest tehsil of District Ghotki by population.Chachar may be the largest caste in the area,occupying the areas of Kamushaheed,Rawanti,and Reti.

Other noteworthy tribes include Rind Baloch in area of Chokmari and Rawanti and Village Qaloo Khan Rind being the largest village of Rind community, Solangi is an other tribe residing the area of sindh-Punjab border of Machko, and many other communities including Seelro, Gurgej, Malik, Dahar, Sheikh, Dayo, Panhwar, Kosh, Shar, Mahar etc

References

Cities and towns in Ghotki District